The Paraguanan ground gecko (Lepidoblepharis montecanoensis) is a species of lizard in the family Sphaerodactylidae.

Geographic range and habitat
L. montecanoensis is endemic to the Paraguaná Peninsula, Falcón State, northern Venezuela, and may be restricted to tropical dry forest habitats.

Etymology
L. montecanoensis is named after the type locality, Monte Cano.

Description
L. montecanoensis is a small gecko: the holotype measures  in snout–vent length (SVL), with a tail almost as long.

Reproduction
L. montecanoensis is oviparous.

Conservation status
Most specimens of L. montecanoensis have been collected from the Monte Cano Reserve. Livestock are grazing within the reserve, potentially leading to habitat fragmentation. Also the expanding human population and infrastructure development in the area are threats to this species. However, too little is known about this species for a more accurate assessment.

References

Further reading
Markezich, Allan L.; Taphorn, Donald C. (1994). "A New Lepidoblepharis (Squamata: Gekkonidae) from the Paraguaná Peninsula, Venezuela, with Comments on Its Conservation Status". Herpetologica 50 (1): 7–14. (Lepidoblepharis montecanoensis, new species).
Rivas, Gilson A.; Molina, César R.; Ugueto, Gabriel N.; Barros, Tito R.; Barrio-Amorós, César L.; Kok, Philippe J. R. (2012). "Reptiles of Venezuela: an updated and commented ckecklist". Zootaxa 3211: 1-64.

Lepidoblepharis
Reptiles of Venezuela
Endemic fauna of Venezuela
Reptiles described in 1994
Taxonomy articles created by Polbot